Peter Lindgren may refer to:

Peter Lindgren (actor) (1915–1981), Swedish actor
Peter Lindgren (musician) (born 1973), Swedish heavy metal guitarist
Peter Lindgren (business theorist) (born 1961),  Danish organizational theorist
Peter Lindgren (tennis), Swedish professional tennis player